Kurri Kurri is a small town in the Hunter Region of New South Wales, Australia, in the Cessnock LGA. Kurri Kurri is the largest town in a group of towns and hamlets, including Stanford Merthyr, Pelaw Main, Weston, Abermain and Heddon Greta, called Kurri Kurri – Weston by the ABS.

Foundation
The town was founded in 1902 to service the local Stanford Merthyr and Pelaw Main collieries and mining communities. The town was named Kurri Kurri from an unknown source in Sydney, meaning "the very first" as it was the first town in Australia that was fully planned before anything was built. The local Progress Committee was responsible for clearing streets and supplying local services with State permission. The fire station and the hospital were built by locals with locally sourced money. 

There is no history of any Aboriginal inhabitants of this area, other than a visit to the outskirts by a small group prior to most of the building of the town. A family with some Aboriginal background lived in Kurri Kurri in the 1930-40s. The first European landholder was Benjamin Blackburn who was granted 400 acres on the Banks of Wallis Creek at Richmond Vale.

The Kurri Kurri Hotel (1904) is one of several built during the era of mining prosperity in the early 20th century. It is an impressive three-story building featuring prominent verandas with cast-iron lacework. The Empire Tavern was also built during this period. Kurri Kurri has numerous small miners' cottages from the same period.

Population
According to the 2016 census of Population, there were 6,044 people in Kurri Kurri.
 Aboriginal and Torres Strait Islander people made up 7.6% of the population. 
 86.4% of people were born in Australia. The next most common country of birth was England at 1.7%.   
 91.1% of people spoke only English at home. 
 The most common responses for religion were No Religion 27.4%, Anglican 24.6% and Catholic 20.4%.

Industry

Coal-mining
Mining at the South Maitland Coalfields began at East Greta in 1891, after an 1886 exploration by Sir Edgeworth David, a government geological surveyor, uncovered the potential of the Greta coal seam.  More mines were opened in the early 1900s, supplanting those older pits at Newcastle where the Australian Agricultural Company enjoyed almost a monopoly. During this period there were a number of accidents including the death of six miners at the Stanford Merthyr Colliery in 1905, which is commemorated by a monument in the Kurri Kurri cemetery.

Richmond Main Colliery, also in the Kurri Kurri vicinity, was once the State's largest producer, at 3,400 tons per day, and which reputedly had the deepest shaft permitting access to two separate coal seams, the Scholey shaft, named after its founder, John Scholey. Following the serious slump in the coal industry Stanford Merthyr Colliery closed in 1957, Pelaw Main in 1962, and Richmond Main in 1967.

The power station at Richmond Main Colliery, which provided the electricity for Kurri Kurri and surrounding districts, remained in operation for some years after the mine's closure, until the entire district was attached to the National Grid.

Aluminium smelting

Railways
Kurri Kurri was served by the South Maitland Railway and originally had two passenger stations – one at Stanford Merthyr, and one on the main SMR line at North Kurri Kurri (opened in June 1904). A new red-brick station building and platform was built at Stanford Merthyr and opened in January 1909. It was renamed Kurri Kurri Station on 3 June 1922. However, with the closure of the SMR's branch line from Aberdare Junction to Stanford Merthyr, due to subsidence, North Kurri Kurri station was renamed Kurri Kurri in the mid-1930s. The station at Stanford Merthyr fell into disuse although the line from the colliery which passed through it was still in operation via the Richmond Vale Railway to Hexham. While passenger services on the South Maitland Railway have ceased, the line is still in use for coal haulage. A new bridge is to be constructed to relocate the railway line to allow construction of the Hunter Expressway.

Local government
Until the creation of the local government area known as the City of Cessnock, Kurri Kurri was the centre of the Shire of Kearsley, which included most of the rural areas and villages around the township of Cessnock and part of the western suburbs of Maitland.

Civic Participation Events

Tidy Towns 
In 1988 the town established a Tidy Town Committee under the stewardship of the Keep Australia Beautiful competition. The town achieved immediate success and in the space of 6 years took the best town in NSW in 1993 and was a finalist in the best town in Australia.

This was followed by the establishment of the Small Towns committee known as Towns with Heart.

Mulletfest 
A pub-driven event called Mulletfest has been growing in Kurri Kurri for the past two years. The event celebrates the mullet haircut and other aspects of self-identified bogan culture (such as pub rock music). The event has been well received by locals and attracts attendees from around the country.

Nostalgia Festival 
Each year Kurri Kurri hosts a 1950s/1960s inspired Nostalgia Festival featuring rock 'n' roll dancing, hot rod and bike shows.

Education

Primary schools
 Kurri Kurri Public School
 Kurri Kurri Infants School
 The Holy Spirit Primary School
 Stanford Merthyr Infants School
 Pelaw Main Public School
 Weston Public School
 Abermain Public School

Secondary schools
Kurri Kurri High School

Tertiary campuses
 Hunter Institute of TAFE Kurri Kurri Campus

Local art
It is now becoming internationally renowned for its murals with more than 55 murals painted around the town and its environs depicting the history of the region and also recent events.

Sport
Retired Newcastle Knights Rugby league player Andrew Johns spent his childhood in Kurri Kurri, before moving to Cessnock. He would later play in the Kurri Kurri Under-16's side, as Cessnock was unable to field a team. Kurri Kurri is also noted as having produced more Rugby League internationals than any other bush town in Australia.

The speedway has hosted a round of the Australian Solo Speedway Championship every year since 2011 as well as hosting the Australian Sidecar Speedway Championship twice (2012, 2014), the Australian Under-21 Solo Championship on three occasions (2012, 2013, 2015), the Australian Under-16 Solo Championship in 2012, and the NSW Solo Championship each year since 2011. The speedway has also hosted rounds of the Sidecar Grand Slam series and also holds the Jason Crump invitational for solos annually on Boxing Day in honour of Australia's only triple Speedway World Champion. Loxford Park also includes a  junior (under-16) track on its infield.

Heritage listings
Kurri Kurri has a number of heritage-listed sites, including:
 South Maitland Coalfields: Richmond Main Colliery

Notable people
 Ken Booth – school teacher, sportsman, and politician
 Jim Comerford - union leader, writer, and miner
 Luke Ford – writer
 Bill Hamilton – rugby league footballer
 Paul Harragon – rugby league footballer
 Jemma House - soccer player
 Mark Hughes – rugby league footballer
 Bert James – Federal politician
 Richard Johnson – soccer player
 Ernest Llewellyn – violinist, violist
 Eddie Lumsden – rugby league footballer
 Greg McLaren – poet
 George Neilly – NSW State politician
 Sandy Pearson – Australian Army Major General
 Melody Pool - Country-folk musician
 Chad Reed – International motocross and supercross racer
 John Sattler – rugby league footballer
 Richard Saunders – sceptic
 Adam Shields – Motorcycle speedway rider
 Jamie Stauffer – Australian Superbike motorcycle racer
Casey Stoner – Two Time MotoGP World Champion
 Reegan Tanner – rugby league footballer

See also
 List of reduplicated Australian place names

Notes

  The figure presented represents the average elevation as shown in 1:100000 map CESSNOCK 9132.
  Area calculation is based on NSW GNB maps.

References

 Eardley, Gifford, H., The Railways of the South Maitland Coalfields, Australian Railway Historical Society, NSW Division, Sydney, 1969: many references therein.

Suburbs of City of Cessnock
Towns in the Hunter Region